The Liberia Baptist Missionary and Educational Convention is a Baptist Christian denomination in Liberia. It is affiliated with the Baptist World Alliance. The headquarters is in Monrovia.

History
The Liberia Baptist Missionary and Educational Convention has its origins in an American mission of the Richmond African Baptist Missionary Society in 1821.  It is officially founded in 1880.   According to a denomination census released in 2020, it claimed 289 churches and 55,298 members.

Schools
It founded the Liberia Baptist Theological Seminary in Monrovia in 1976.

References

External links
 Official Website

Baptist denominations in Africa
Baptist Christianity in Liberia
Monrovia